Jessica's Guide to Dating on the Dark Side is a young adult novel by Beth Fantaskey. The book was published by Graphia Houghton Mifflin Harcourt in 2009.

In the book, Jessica, a 17-year-old adopted child, discovers that she is a descendant of vampire royalty.

Reception 
It was reviewed in Kirkus Reviews and Bulletin of the Center for Children's Books. It received a starred review from Publishers Weekly.

Sequels 
The books was followed byJessica Rules the Dark Side, published in 2012.

References

Young adult fantasy novels
Vampire novels
2009 American novels
Harcourt (publisher) books